Edgar N. Keembe is a Zambian politician. He served as Member of the National Assembly for Bweengwa from 1995 until 2001.

Biography
A member of the Movement for Multi-Party Democracy (MMD), Keembe was elected to the National Assembly in a 1995 by-election following the death of the incumbent MP Baldwin Nkumbula. He was re-elected in the 1996 general elections. In April 2001 he was suspended from the MMD for opposing attempts by President Frederick Chiluba to seek a third term in office. He subsequently left the party and joined the Forum for Democracy and Development (FDD). He was the FDD candidate in Bweengwa in the 2001 general elections, but was defeated by Japhet Moonde of the United Party for National Development. He later rejoined the MMD and became its Deputy National Chairman.

References

Movement for Multi-Party Democracy politicians
Forum for Democracy and Development politicians
Members of the National Assembly of Zambia